The Torrance Police Department is the police department serving Torrance, California.

The department employs 227 sworn officers and 124 civilians. The department is the largest law enforcement agency in South Bay, and is one of the largest police departments in Los Angeles County.

Since June 2021, the Chief of Police has been Jay Hart.

Overview

The Torrance Police Department has jurisdiction in the city limits of Torrance. Other sections with a "Torrance, CA" address are served by either the Los Angeles Police Department (the Harbor Gateway area east of Western Avenue) or the Los Angeles County Sheriff's Department in an unincorporated area adjacent to the Harbor Freeway with the ZIP code of 90502.  Both areas are easily identified by their Los Angeles County-styled street signage.  The department patrols an approximate one mile (1.6 km) area of Torrance Beach.

Officers carry the Glock 21 .45 Auto as the primary sidearm and the holster of choice is made and produced by Safariland.

Bureaus/Units
 Administrative Bureau; consisting of the Personnel, Research & Training and Records Divisions
 Support Services Bureau; consisting of the Communications and Services Divisions
 Patrol Bureau; consisting of the Patrol and Community Affairs Divisions
 Special Operations Bureau; consisting of the Special Investigations and Detective Divisions
 Special Units include; Robbery/Homicide, Cold Case Homicide, SWAT, Crisis Negotiation Team (CNT), K-9, Motors, School Resource Officer (SRO), Community Lead Officer (CLO), etc...

Controversy
During the massive multi-agency manhunt for Christopher Jordan Dorner, the prime suspect in the 2013 Southern California shootings, in two separate incidents in the early morning hours of February 7, 2013, police shot at people unrelated to Dorner.  Dorner was not present at either incident.
Officers of the Torrance Police Department initiated the shooting in the second of these two cases.

Torrance police officers first rammed the truck with their car, then opened fire. The vehicle was being driven by David Perdue who was on his way to the beach for some early morning surfing before work.  Police claim that Perdue's pickup truck "matched the description" of the one belonging to Dorner.  
However, the Los Angeles Times reports that "the pickups were different makes and colors ... Perdue looks nothing like Dorner: He's several inches shorter and about a hundred pounds lighter ... Perdue is white; Dorner is black."

Six months after the assault, the police paid Perdue $20,000 for the damage to his truck. The city has offered Perdue a half million dollars to settle the case, but he insists on almost four million dollars. , the city has not allowed outside investigators to see the truck.

In contrast, the Los Angeles Police Department paid two women who were attacked a sum of $4.2 million in damages without going to court.

In popular culture
In the 2015 film Straight Outta Compton, members of the Torrance Police Department harass members of N.W.A.

See also

 Law enforcement in Los Angeles County
 List of law enforcement agencies in California

References

External links
 Torrance Police Department
 "A Journey to Service"
 Torrance Police Recruiting Commercials

Municipal police departments of California
Organizations based in Torrance, California